Moxico (Portuguese spelling) or Moshiko (Bantu spelling) is the largest province of Angola. The province has a population of 758,568 (2014 census) and a population density of approximately 3.4 residents per km² (8.8/sq mi), making it one of the most sparsely populated areas of Angola. The population of the province is in flux; displaced residents have slowly returned to Moxico since the end of the Angolan Civil War in 2002. The war left Moxico as one of the most landmine-contaminated places in the world. The governor of the province is Gonçalves Manuel Muandumba.

History

Moxico Province was the scene of much guerrilla fighting during the Angolan Civil War. Its long border with Zambia at the east of the province was a base of operations for UNITA and MPLA. As a result, Moxico Province saw many raids by the military of South Africa.

Moxico Province is known as the place where UNITA rebel leader Jonas Savimbi was killed in 2002, signalling an end to over a quarter-century civil war in Angola.

Geography

Moxico Province borders Lunda Sul Province to the north, Bié Province to the west, Cuando Cubango Province to the south, the nation of Zambia to the east, and the Democratic Republic of the Congo to the northeast.

Municipalities
The province of Moxico contains nine municipalities:

 Alto Zambeze (Cazombo)
 Bundas (Lumbala-N'guimbo)
 Camanongue
 Cameia (Lumeje)
 Léua
 Luau
 Luacano
 Luchazes
 Moxico (Luena)

Moxico is also home to Cameia National Park in the Cameia Municipality.

Communes
The province of Moxico contains the following communes; sorted by their respective municipalities:

 Alto Zambeze Municipality – Caianda (Kaianda), Calunda, Cazombo, Lóvua Leste (Lóvua do Zambeze), Lumbala-Caquengue (Lumbala-Kakengue), Macondo, Nana Candundo (Candundo)
 Bundas Municipality – Chiume, Lumbala-Guimbo (Lumbala-N'guimbo) Lutembo, Luvuei, Mussuma, Ninda, Sessa
 Camanongue Municipality – Camanongue
 Cameia Municipality – Cameia (Lumeje)
 Léua Municipality – Léua, Liangongo
 Luau Municipality – Luau
 Luacano Municipality – Lago-Dilolo, Luacano
 Luchazes Municipality – Cangamba (Kangamba), Cangombe, Cassamba, Muié, Tempué
 Moxico Municipality – Cangumbe (Kangumbe), Cachipoque, Lucusse, Luena, Lutuai (Muangai)

Demographics 

Moxico Province is composed of a diversity of ethnic groups, and is primarily a Bantu area. Populations of Chokwe, Lovale, Mbunda, Lucazi, and Ovimbundu make up the majority of the province. Isolated communities of other ethnic groups exist throughout Moxico.

Chokwe language is the most commonly spoken language in the province.

List of governors

See also
Caianda

References

External links
 Official website of province governor
 Information on this province at the Angolan ministry for territorial administration
 Information on this province at Info Angola
 Angolan embassy in London on Moxico province
 Province geographical info at geoview.info

 
Provinces of Angola